The Danneskiold-Laurvig Mansion is a historic building situated at Store Kongensgade 68 in central Copenhagen, Denmark. It was built in association with the Moltke's Mansion in Bredgade on the other side of the block.

History

Danneskiold-Laurvig family
 
Ferdinand Anton Danneskiold-Laurvig was the son of Ulrik Frederik Gyldenløve. When his father died in 1704 he inherited Gyldenløve's Little Mansion at the corner of Dronningens Tværgade and  Bredgade as well as the County of Laurvig in Norway. He purchased a number of smaller lots in Store Kongensgade in the 1720s. It is unclear when the building at Store Kongensgade was built. Most sources state that it was most likely built to a design by Johann Adam Soherr in circa 1745. Ida Haugsted states that it was more likely built in circa 1720-30 to designs by Johan Cornelius Krieger. Krieger was also responsible for adapting the Gyldenløbe Mansion. A garden connected the two buildings and the new building in Store Kongensgade was referred to as Danneskiold-Laurvig's backyard" (Danneskiold-Laurvig's baggård). The new building was also known as Jernmagasinet ("The Iron Store") since stoves and other products from Danneskiold-Laurvig's extensive Fritzøe ironworks in Laurvig in Norway were sold from its ground floor.

Frederik Ludvig Danneskiold-Laurvig succeeded his father in 1754. He died without children in 1762 and all his holdings were therefore transferred to his brother Christian Conrad Danneskiold-Laurvig (1723-1783).

Frédéric de Coninck and Niels Lunde Reiersen
The building was on 3 April 1783 sold to the merchants Frédéric de Coninck and Niels Lunde Reiersen for 46,000 rigsdaler.

The building was at the time of the 1787 census home to three households with a total of 17 residents. Bookkeeper Thomas Christopher Radigend (76 yrs.) lived in the apartment in the western part of the ground floor with his second wife Anne (72 yrs.) and his sister's unmarried daughter Dorthea Helena (64 yrs.) as well as two maids. Counter Admiral Andreas Georg Herman Schultz (1718-1798) and his wife  Anne Margrethe True (1737-1825) lived in the apartment on the first floor. The other members of their household were the 18-year-old girl Charlotte Lindemann (1767-1837) two maids and a servant.

The  40-year-old clerk Jørn Bøttger and his 28-year-old wife Christiane lived with their three children as well as their 27-year-old maid and the property's caretaker Lars Larsen in the apartment on the second floor.

Later owners
 

Reiersen sold his share of the building complex in Bredgade-Store Kongensgade to Frédéric de Coninck in 1789. Later that same year Frédéric de Coninck sold the Danneskiold-Laurvig Mansion  to wine merchant Johan Ludwig Friederich Zinn. He was a nephew of Johann Ludvig Zinn with whom he stayed in the Zinn House at the time of the 1787 census.

Architecture 
 

The Rococo-style mansion is 11 bays wide and has a median risalit decorated with pilasters. It was expanded with an extra floor sometime in the 19th century. It was listed on the Danish registry of protected buildings and places in 1954.

List of owners
 (1704-1654) Ferdinand Anton Danneskiold-Laurvig
 (1754-1652) Frederik Ludvig Danneskiold-Laurvig
 (1754-1673) 
 (1783-1789) Frédéric de Coninck and Niels Lunde Reiersen
 (1789-1799) Frédéric de Coninck
 (1799-1810) Johan Ludwig Friederich Zinn
 (1810-1811) Meyer& Trier
 (1811-1811) Moritz Meyer Leopold Breslau von Bressendorff
 (1811-1816) Knud Bille Schack
 (1816-1829) Watt & Gordon
 (1829-1868) Joseph Owen

References

External links

Listed residential buildings in Copenhagen
Houses completed in 1746
Rococo architecture in Copenhagen